Julian Calero Fernández (born 26 October 1970) is a Spanish retired footballer who played as a midfielder, and the current head coach of Burgos CF.

Following a playing career spent entirely at the amateur level, he coached mainly as an assistant, including with the Spain national team at the 2018 World Cup.

Career
Born in Madrid, Calero represented AD Parla, CF Fuenlabrada, CA Pinto, Valdemoro CF, RSD Alcalá and CD Coslada as a player. He began his manager career with the former's youth setup, and moved to Atlético Madrid in 2003.

In 2005, Calero was appointed Míchel's assistant at Segunda División B side Rayo Vallecano. After the manager's departure to Real Madrid, he left Rayo and was named manager of Los Blancos' youth categories; he also was in the staff of the reserves, behind Juan Carlos Mandiá and Julen Lopetegui.

In October 2009, Calero replaced Juanvi Peinado at the helm of Fútbol Alcobendas Sport in Tercera División. He left the club the following May, being replaced by Alfredo Santaelena, and in October he was named at the helm of former club Parla.

Calero moved abroad for the first time in his career in May 2011, being appointed assistant of Dmitri Cheryshev at Russian Premier League side FC Volga Nizhny Novgorod. He subsequently returned for another spell at Parla before being appointed in charge of AD Alcorcón B on 26 December 2012.

In 2013, Calero acted as Luis Milla's second at Al Jazira Club. On 24 March of the following year, he was appointed manager of another club he represented as a player, Atlético Pinto.

Calero was appointed assistant of FC Porto on 7 May 2014, behind Lopetegui. On 15 June 2016, he joined Fernando Hierro's staff at Real Oviedo.

On 3 July 2017, Calero was appointed manager of CDA Navalcarnero in the third division. He led the club to a sixth position during the campaign, finishing two points shy of the play-offs.

Calero joined Hierro's staff at the Spain national team on 13 June 2018, being named his assistant. On 1 July of the following year, he took over CF Rayo Majadahonda, freshly relegated from Segunda División, but was dismissed on 3 March 2020, as the club were six points off the play-offs.

On 30 June 2020, Calero was named manager of fellow third level side Burgos CF, and led the side back to Segunda División after 19 years. He made his professional level debut as a player or manager on 15 August 2021 in a 1–0 loss at Sporting de Gijón.

Personal life
Calero's son Iván is also a footballer and a midfielder.

Managerial statistics

References

External links

1970 births
Living people
Footballers from Madrid
Spanish footballers
Association football midfielders
CF Fuenlabrada footballers
RSD Alcalá players
Segunda División B players
Tercera División players
Spanish football managers
Segunda División managers
Segunda División B managers
Tercera División managers
CF Rayo Majadahonda managers
Burgos CF managers
Atlético Madrid non-playing staff
Rayo Vallecano non-playing staff
Real Madrid CF non-playing staff
Al Jazira Club non-playing staff
Real Oviedo non-playing staff